A Christmas Story is the fifth album and first Christmas album by Contemporary Christian group Point of Grace. It was released in 1999 by Word Records.

The album features several traditional Christmas songs arranged especially for the group, plus some original songs.

The group heavily promoted the album, appearing in various national media outlets as well as appearing on Amy Grant's Christmas Tour.

Track listing

Personnel 

Point of Grace
 Shelley Breen – vocals 
 Heather Payne – vocals 
 Denise Jones – vocals
 Terry Jones – vocals

Musicians
 Chris Eaton – acoustic piano (2), arrangements (2, 3), vocal arrangements (4-7, 9, 11, 12, 13)
 Shane Keister – additional keyboards (2), acoustic piano (10, 11, 13), track arrangements (11), orchestra arrangements (11)
 Blair Masters – additional keyboards (2, 3, 9, 14)
 Brent Bourgeois – acoustic piano (3), arrangements (3), vocal arrangements (9)
 Matt Rollings – acoustic piano (8)
 Tom Hemby – electric guitar (2), acoustic guitar (14)
 Jerry McPherson – electric guitar (2, 3, 13), guitar (9, 10, 11), percussion (11)
 Gordon Kennedy – electric guitar (3)
 Rivers Rutherford – acoustic guitar (11, 14), gut-string guitar (13)
 Chris Leuzinger – electric guitar (14)
 Adam Anders – bass (2)
 Jimmie Lee Sloas – bass (3)
 Leland Sklar – bass (9, 10, 11, 13, 14)
 Paul Leim – drums (2, 9, 10, 11, 13, 14), percussion (11)
 Chris McHugh – drums (3)
 Eric Darken – percussion (2, 3, 8-11, 13)
 Skaila Kanga – harp (6)
 Sam Levine – pennywhistle (2), recorder (2, 13), alto saxophone (10)
 Mark Douthit – saxophone (4, 9), alto saxophone (10)
 Jeff Coffin – baritone saxophone (10)
 Doug Moffet – tenor saxophone (10)
 Denis Solee – tenor saxophone (10)
 Ernie Collins – trombone (10)
 Chris Dunn – trombone (10)
 Barry Green – trombone (10)
 Chris McDonald – trombone (10)
 Mike Haynes – trumpet (10)
 Steve Patrick – trumpet (10)
 Richard Steffen – trumpet (10)
 George Tidwell – trumpet (10)
 Carl Marsh – arrangements (1, 5–8, 12), orchestration (2, 3, 8, 9, 14), vocal arrangements (5, 7), brass arrangements (10), rhythm track arrangements (10)
 Ronn Huff – orchestration (4), vocal arrangements (4, 10)
 Tim Davis – vocal arrangements (10)
 Gavyn Wright – concertmaster
 Philippe Dunnigan – contractor
 The London Session Orchestra – orchestra
 Ensemble Claude-Gervaise – medieval orchestra (7, 12)
 F.A.C.E. Treble Choir – choir (2, 7, 8)
 The Kid Connection – children choir (2, 13)
 Michael Tait – vocal soloist (9)

Production 
 Producer – Brown Bannister
 A&R Direction – Brent Bourgeois
 A&R Coordination – Linda Bourne Wornell
 Recorded and Mixed by Steve Bishir
 Mix Assistant – Hank Nirider
 Recording Assistants – Jedd Hackett, Melissa Mattey, Hank Nirider and Greg Parker.
 Additional Engineering – Patrick Kelly, Russ Long and David Schober.
 London Session Orchestra recorded by Steve Price
 Medievil orchestra and choir recorded by Rob Healey
 Harp and tin whistle recorded by Steve Bishir
 Mixed at Seventeen Grand (Nashville, TN) and Bulldog Studio (Franklin, TN).
 Editing by Fred Paragano
 Mastered by Alan Yashita at A&M Mastering (Hollywood, CA).
 Production Manager – Traci Sterling Bishir
 Music Copyist – Mike Casteel
 Art Direction – Chuck Hargett and Beth Lee
 Design – Beth Lee
 Photography – Michael Haber
 Styling – Pauline Leonard
 Hair and Make-up – Melissa Schliecher and Melanie Shelley

1999 Christmas albums
Christmas albums by American artists
Point of Grace albums
Albums produced by Brown Bannister